A Day's Pleasure (1919) is Charlie Chaplin's fourth film for First National Films. It was created at the Chaplin Studio. It was a quickly made two-reeler to help fill a gap while working on his first feature The Kid. It is about a day outing with his wife and the kids and things do not go smoothly. Edna Purviance plays Chaplin's wife and Jackie Coogan one of the kids. The first scene shows the Chaplin Studio corner office in the background while Chaplin tries to get his car started.

Plot summary

Cast
 Charles Chaplin as Father
 Edna Purviance as Mother
 Marion Feducha as Small Boy (uncredited)
 Bob Kelly as Small Boy (uncredited)
 Jackie Coogan as Smallest Boy (uncredited)
 Tom Wilson as Large Husband (uncredited)
 Babe London as His Seasick Wife (uncredited)
 Henry Bergman as Captain, Man in Car and Heavy Policeman (uncredited)
 Loyal Underwood as Angry Little Man in Street (uncredited)

Plot
After an initial scene featuring a Ford which is extremely reluctant to start, most of the action takes place on an excursion ferry. Gags revolve around seasickness, which Charlie, a fat couple, and even the boat's all-black ragtime band succumb to, deckchairs, and Charlie's comic pugnacity. This is followed by a scene of the family returning home, and encountering trouble at an intersection, which involves a traffic cop, and hot tar.

Reception
A Day's Pleasure is almost universally regarded as Chaplin's least impressive First National film. Even contemporary critics were muted in their enthusiasm, as evidenced by this mixed review from The New York Times of December 8, 1919 :"Charlie Chaplin is screamingly funny in his latest picture, A Day's Pleasure, at the Strand, when he tries in vain to solve the mysteries of a collapsible deck chair. He is also funny in many little bits of pantomime and burlesque, in which he is inimitable. But most of the time he depends for comedy upon seasickness, a Ford car, and biff-bang slap-stick, with which he is little, if any, funnier than many other screen comedians."

References

External links

 
 
 

1919 films
American silent short films
American black-and-white films
1919 comedy films
Silent American comedy films
Short films directed by Charlie Chaplin
1919 short films
American comedy short films
First National Pictures films
Surviving American silent films
1910s American films